Castione is a Swiss village in Ticino. It may also refer to some places in Italy:

Castione Andevenno, a municipality of the Province of Sondrio, Lombardy
Castione della Presolana, a municipality of the Province of Bergamo, Lombardy
Castione (Bergamo), in Lombardy region of northern Italy
Castione (Brentonico), a hamlet of Brentonico (TN), Trentino-Südtirol
Castione (Loria), a hamlet of Loria (TV), Veneto
Castione dei Marchesi, a hamlet of Fidenza (PR), Emilia-Romagna

See also
Castiglione (disambiguation)
Battle of Castione, a battle of 1449 between the Golden Ambrosian Republic and the canton of Uri